Linguistics is the scientific study of human language. It is called a scientific study because it entails a comprehensive, systematic, objective, and precise analysis of all aspects of language — cognitive, social, environmental, biological as well as structural. 

Linguistics is considered to be an applied science as well as an academic field of general study within the humanities and social sciences. Traditional areas of linguistic analysis correspond to syntax (rules governing the structure of sentences), semantics (meaning), morphology (structure of words), phonetics (speech sounds and equivalent gestures in sign languages), phonology (the abstract sound system of a particular language), and pragmatics (how social context contributes to meaning). Subdisciplines such as biolinguistics (the study of the biological variables and evolution of language) and psycholinguistics (the study of psychological factors in human language) bridge many of these divisions.

Linguistics encompasses many branches and subfields that span both theoretical and practical applications. Theoretical linguistics (including traditional descriptive linguistics) is concerned with understanding the universal and fundamental nature of language and developing a general theoretical framework for describing it. Applied linguistics seeks to utilise the scientific findings of the study of language for practical purposes, such as developing methods of improving language education and literacy.

Linguistic phenomena may be studied through a variety of perspectives: synchronically (by describing the shifts in a language at a certain specific point of time) or diachronically (ie, through the historical development of language over several periods of time), in monolinguals or in multilinguals, amongst children or amongst adults, in terms of how it is being learned or as in terms of how it was acquired, as abstract objects or as cognitive structures, through written texts or through oral elicitation, and finally through mechanical data collection or through practical fieldwork.

Linguistics emerged from the field of philology and the both are now variably described as related fields, subdisciplines, or the latter to have been superseded by linguistics altogether.. Linguistics is also is related to the philosophy of language, stylistics, rhetoric, semiotics, lexicography, and translation.

Major subdisciplines

Historical linguistics 

Historical linguistics is the study of how language changes in history, particularly with regard to a specific language or a group of languages. Western trends in historical linguistics date back to roughly the late 18th century, when the discipline grew out of philology, the study of ancient texts and oral traditions.

Historical linguistics emerged as one of the first few sub-disciplines in the field, and was most widely practiced during the late 19th century. Despite a shift in focus in the twentieth century towards formalism and generative grammar, which studies the universal properties of language, historical research today still remains a significant field of linguistic inquiry. Subfields of the discipline include language change and grammaticalisation.

Historical linguistics studies language change either diachronically (through a comparison of different time periods in the past and present) or in a synchronic manner (by observing developments between different variations that exist within the current linguistic stage of a language).

At first, historical linguistics served as the cornerstone of comparative linguistics, which involves a study of the relationship between different languages. During this time, scholars of historical linguistics were only concerned with creating different categories of language families, and reconstructing prehistoric proto-languages by using both the comparative method and the method of internal reconstruction. Internal reconstruction is the method by which an element that contains a certain meaning is re-used in different contexts or environments where there is a variation in either sound or analogy.

The reason for this had been to describe well-known Indo-European languages, many of which used to have long written histories. Scholars of historical linguistics also studied Uralic languages, another European language family for which very little written material existed back then. After this, there was significant work that followed on the corpora of other languages too, such as that of the Austronesian languages, as well as of Native American language families.

The above approach of comparativism in linguistics is now, however, only a small part of the much broader discipline called historical linguistics. The comparative study of specific Indo-European languages is considered a highly specialised field today, while comparative research is carried out over the subsequent internal developments in a language. In particular, it is carried out over the development of modern standard varieties of languages, or over the development of a language from its standardized form to its varieties.

For instance, some scholars also undertook a study attempting to establish super-families, linking, for example, Indo-European, Uralic, and other language families to Nostratic. While these attempts are still not widely accepted as credible methods, they provide necessary information to establish relatedness in language change, something that is not easily available as the depth of time increases. The time-depth of linguistic methods is generally limited, due to the occurrence of chance word resemblances and variations between language groups, but a limit of around 10,000 years is often assumed for the functional purpose of conducting research. Difficulty also exists in the dating of various proto languages. Even though several methods are available, only approximate results can be obtained in terms of arriving at dates for these languages.

Today, with a subsequent re-development of grammatical studies, historical linguistics studies the change in language on a relational basis between dialect to dialect during one period, as well as between those in the past and the present period, and looks at evolution and shifts taking place morphologically, syntactically, as well as phonetically.

Syntax and morphology

Syntax and morphology are branches of linguistics concerned with the order and structure of meaningful linguistic units such as words and morphemes. Syntacticians study the rules and constraints that govern how speakers of a language can organize words into sentences. Morphologists study similar rules for the order of morphemes—sub-word units such as prefixes and suffixes—and how they may be combined to form words.

While words, along with clitics, are generally accepted as being the smallest units of syntax, in most languages, if not all, many words can be related to other words by rules that collectively describe the grammar for that language. For example, English speakers recognize that the words dog and dogs are closely related, differentiated only by the plurality morpheme "-s", only found bound to noun phrases. Speakers of English recognize these relations from their innate knowledge of English's rules of word formation. They infer intuitively that dog is to dogs as cat is to cats; and, in similar fashion, dog is to dog catcher as dish is to dishwasher. By contrast, Classical Chinese has very little morphology, using almost exclusively unbound morphemes ("free" morphemes) and depending on word order to convey meaning. (Most words in modern Standard Chinese ["Mandarin"], however, are compounds and most roots are bound.) These are understood as grammars that represent the morphology of the language. The rules understood by a speaker reflect specific patterns or regularities in the way words are formed from smaller units in the language they are using, and how those smaller units interact in speech. In this way, morphology is the branch of linguistics that studies patterns of word formation within and across languages and attempts to formulate rules that model the knowledge of the speakers of those languages.

Phonological and orthographic modifications between a base word and its origin may be partial to literacy skills. Studies have indicated that the presence of modification in phonology and orthography makes morphologically complex words harder to understand and that the absence of modification between a base word and its origin makes morphologically complex words easier to understand. Morphologically complex words are easier to comprehend when they include a base word.

Polysynthetic languages, such as Chukchi, have words composed of many morphemes. The Chukchi word "təmeyŋəlevtpəγtərkən", for example, meaning "I have a fierce headache", is composed of eight morphemes t-ə-meyŋ-ə-levt-pəγt-ə-rkən that may be glossed. The morphology of such languages allows for each consonant and vowel to be understood as morphemes, while the grammar of the language indicates the usage and understanding of each morpheme.

The discipline that deals specifically with the sound changes occurring within morphemes is morphophonology.

Semantics and pragmatics 

Semantics and pragmatics are branches of linguistics concerned with meaning. These subfields have traditionally been divided according to aspects of meaning thought to arise from the grammar versus linguistic and social context. Semantics in this conception is concerned with grammatical and lexical meanings and pragmatics concerned with meaning in context. The framework of formal semantics studies the denotations of sentences and the way they are composed from the meanings of their constituent expressions. Formal semantics draws heavily on philosophy of language and uses formal tools from logic and computer science. Cognitive semantics ties linguistic meaning to general aspects of cognition, drawing on ideas from cognitive science such as prototype theory.

Pragmatics encompasses phenomena such as speech acts, implicature, and talk in interaction. Unlike semantics, which examines meaning that is conventional or "coded" in a given language, pragmatics studies how the transmission of meaning depends not only on structural and linguistic knowledge (grammar, lexicon, etc.) of the speaker and listener but also on the context of the utterance, any pre-existing knowledge about those involved, the inferred intent of the speaker, and other factors. In that respect, pragmatics explains how language users are able to overcome apparent ambiguity since meaning relies on the manner, place, time, etc. of an utterance.

Phonetics and phonology 

Phonetics and phonology are branches of linguistics concerned with sounds (or the equivalent aspects of sign languages). Phonetics is largely concerned with the physical aspects of sounds such as their articulation, acoustics, production, and perception. Phonology is concerned with the linguistic abstractions and categorizations of sounds, and it tells us what sounds are in a language, how they do and can combine into words, and explains why certain phonetic features are important to identifying a word.

Typology

Language varieties 

Languages exist on a wide continuum of conventionalization with blurry divisions between concepts such as dialects and languages. Languages can undergo internal changes which lead to the development of subvarieties such as linguistic registers, Accents, and dialects. Similarly, languages can undergo changes caused by contact with speakers of other languages, and new language varieties may be born from these contact situations through the process of language genesis.

Contact varieties 

Contact varieties such as pidgins and creoles are language varieties that often arise in situations of sustained contact between communities that speak different languages. Pidgins are language varieties with limited conventionalization where ideas are conveyed through simplified grammars that may grow more complex as linguistic contact continues. Creole languages are language varieties similar to pidgins but with greater conventionalization and stability. As children grow up in contact situations, they may learn a local pidgin as their native language. Through this process of acquisition and transmission, new grammatical features and lexical items are created and introduced to fill gaps in the pidgin eventually developing into a complete language.

Not all language contact situations result in the development of a pidgin or creole, and researchers have studied the features of contact situations that make contact varieties more likely to develop. Often these varieties arise in situations of colonization and enslavement, where power imbalances prevent the contact groups from learning the other's language but sustained contact is nevertheless maintained. The subjugated language in the power relationship is the substrate language, while the dominant language serves as the superstrate. Often the words and lexicon of a contact variety come from the superstrate, making it the lexifier, while grammatical structures come from the substrate, but this is not always the case.

Dialect 
A dialect is a variety of language that is characteristic of a particular group among the language's speakers. The group of people who are the speakers of a dialect are usually bound to each other by social identity. This is what differentiates a dialect from a register or a discourse, where in the latter case, cultural identity does not always play a role. Dialects are speech varieties that have their own grammatical and phonological rules, linguistic features, and stylistic aspects, but have not been given an official status as a language. Dialects often move on to gain the status of a language due to political and social reasons. Other times, dialects remain marginalized, particularly when they are associated with marginalized social groups. Differentiation amongst dialects (and subsequently, languages) is based upon the use of grammatical rules, syntactic rules, and stylistic features, though not always on lexical use or vocabulary. The popular saying that "a language is a dialect with an army and navy" is attributed as a definition formulated by Max Weinreich.

Standard language 

When a dialect is documented sufficiently through the linguistic description of its grammar, which has emerged through the consensual laws from within its community, it gains political and national recognition through a country or region's policies. That is the stage when a language is considered a standard variety, one whose grammatical laws have now stabilised from within the consent of speech community participants, after sufficient evolution, improvisation, correction, and growth. The English language, besides perhaps the French language, may be examples of languages that have arrived at a stage where they are said to have become standard varieties.

Relativity 
As constructed popularly through the Sapir–Whorf hypothesis, relativists believe that the structure of a particular language is capable of influencing the cognitive patterns through which a person shapes his or her world view. Universalists believe that there are commonalities between human perception as there is in the human capacity for language, while relativists believe that this varies from language to language and person to person. While the Sapir–Whorf hypothesis is an elaboration of this idea expressed through the writings of American linguists Edward Sapir and Benjamin Lee Whorf, it was Sapir's student Harry Hoijer who termed it thus. The 20th century German linguist Leo Weisgerber also wrote extensively about the theory of relativity. Relativists argue for the case of differentiation at the level of cognition and in semantic domains. The emergence of cognitive linguistics in the 1980s also revived an interest in linguistic relativity. Thinkers like George Lakoff have argued that language reflects different cultural metaphors, while the French philosopher of language Jacques Derrida's writings, especially about deconstruction, have been seen to be closely associated with the relativist movement in linguistics, for which he was heavily criticized in the media at the time of his death.

Structures 

Linguistic structures are pairings of meaning and form. Any particular pairing of meaning and form is a Saussurean linguistic sign. For instance, the meaning "cat" is represented worldwide with a wide variety of different sound patterns (in oral languages), movements of the hands and face (in sign languages), and written symbols (in written languages). Linguistic patterns have proven their importance for the knowledge engineering field especially with the ever-increasing amount of available data.

Linguists focusing on structure attempt to understand the rules regarding language use that native speakers know (not always consciously). All linguistic structures can be broken down into component parts that are combined according to (sub)conscious rules, over multiple levels of analysis. For instance, consider the structure of the word "tenth" on two different levels of analysis. On the level of internal word structure (known as morphology), the word "tenth" is made up of one linguistic form indicating a number and another form indicating ordinality. The rule governing the combination of these forms ensures that the ordinality marker "th" follows the number "ten." On the level of sound structure (known as phonology), structural analysis shows that the "n" sound in "tenth" is made differently from the "n" sound in "ten" spoken alone. Although most speakers of English are consciously aware of the rules governing internal structure of the word pieces of "tenth", they are less often aware of the rule governing its sound structure. Linguists focused on structure find and analyze rules such as these, which govern how native speakers use language.

Grammar 
Grammar is a system of rules which governs the production and use of utterances in a given language. These rules apply to sound as well as meaning, and include componential subsets of rules, such as those pertaining to phonology (the organisation of phonetic sound systems), morphology (the formation and composition of words), and syntax (the formation and composition of phrases and sentences). Modern frameworks that deal with the principles of grammar include structural and functional linguistics, and generative linguistics.

Sub-fields that focus on a grammatical study of language include the following:
 Phonetics, the study of the physical properties of speech sound production and perception, and delves into their acoustic and articulatory properties
 Phonology, the study of sounds as abstract elements in the speaker's mind that distinguish meaning (phonemes)
 Morphology, the study of morphemes, or the internal structures of words and how they can be modified
 Syntax, the study of how words combine to form grammatical phrases and sentences
 Semantics, the study of lexical and grammatical aspects of meaning
 Pragmatics, the study of how utterances are used in communicative acts, and the role played by situational context and non-linguistic knowledge in the transmission of meaning
 Discourse analysis, the analysis of language use in texts (spoken, written, or signed)
 Stylistics, the study of linguistic factors (rhetoric, diction, stress) that place a discourse in context
 Semiotics, the study of signs and sign processes (semiosis), indication, designation, likeness, analogy, metaphor, symbolism, signification, and communication

Discourse 
Discourse is language as social practice (Baynham, 1995) and is a multilayered concept. As a social practice, discourse embodies different ideologies through written and spoken texts. Discourse analysis can examine or expose these ideologies. Discourse influences genre, which is chosen in response to different situations and finally, at micro level, discourse influences language as text (spoken or written) at the phonological or lexico-grammatical level. Grammar and discourse are linked as parts of a system. A particular discourse becomes a language variety when it is used in this way for a particular purpose, and is referred to as a register. There may be certain lexical additions (new words) that are brought into play because of the expertise of the community of people within a certain domain of specialization. Registers and discourses therefore differentiate themselves through the use of vocabulary, and at times through the use of style too. People in the medical fraternity, for example, may use some medical terminology in their communication that is specialized to the field of medicine. This is often referred to as being part of the "medical discourse", and so on.

Lexicon 
The lexicon is a catalogue of words and terms that are stored in a speaker's mind. The lexicon consists of words and bound morphemes, which are parts of words that can't stand alone, like affixes. In some analyses, compound words and certain classes of idiomatic expressions and other collocations are also considered to be part of the lexicon. Dictionaries represent attempts at listing, in alphabetical order, the lexicon of a given language; usually, however, bound morphemes are not included. Lexicography, closely linked with the domain of semantics, is the science of mapping the words into an encyclopedia or a dictionary. The creation and addition of new words (into the lexicon) is called coining or neologization, and the new words are called neologisms.

It is often believed that a speaker's capacity for language lies in the quantity of words stored in the lexicon. However, this is often considered a myth by linguists. The capacity for the use of language is considered by many linguists to lie primarily in the domain of grammar, and to be linked with competence, rather than with the growth of vocabulary. Even a very small lexicon is theoretically capable of producing an infinite number of sentences.

Style 
Stylistics also involves the study of written, signed, or spoken discourse through varying speech communities, genres, and editorial or narrative formats in the mass media. It involves the study and interpretation of texts for aspects of their linguistic and tonal style. Stylistic analysis entails the analysis of description of particular dialects and registers used by speech communities. Stylistic features include rhetoric, diction, stress, satire, irony, dialogue, and other forms of phonetic variations. Stylistic analysis can also include the study of language in canonical works of literature, popular fiction, news, advertisements, and other forms of communication in popular culture as well. It is usually seen as a variation in communication that changes from speaker to speaker and community to community. In short, Stylistics is the interpretation of text.

In the 1960s, Jacques Derrida, for instance, further distinguished between speech and writing, by proposing that written language be studied as a linguistic medium of communication in itself. Palaeography is therefore the discipline that studies the evolution of written scripts (as signs and symbols) in language. The formal study of language also led to the growth of fields like psycholinguistics, which explores the representation and function of language in the mind; neurolinguistics, which studies language processing in the brain; biolinguistics, which studies the biology and evolution of language; and language acquisition, which investigates how children and adults acquire the knowledge of one or more languages.

Approaches

Humanistic 
The fundamental principle of humanistic linguistics is that language is an invention created by people. A semiotic tradition of linguistic research considers language a sign system which arises from the interaction of meaning and form. The organisation of linguistic levels is considered computational. Linguistics is essentially seen as relating to social and cultural studies because different languages are shaped in social interaction by the speech community. Frameworks representing the humanistic view of language include structural linguistics, among others.

Structural analysis means dissecting each linguistic level: phonetic, morphological, syntactic, and discourse, to the smallest units. These are collected into inventories (e.g. phoneme, morpheme, lexical classes, phrase types) to study their interconnectedness within a hierarchy of structures and layers. Functional analysis adds to structural analysis the assignment of semantic and other functional roles that each unit may have. For example, a noun phrase may function as the subject or object of the sentence; or the agent or patient.

Functional linguistics, or functional grammar, is a branch of structural linguistics. In the humanistic reference, the terms structuralism and functionalism are related to their meaning in other human sciences. The difference between formal and functional structuralism lies in the way that the two approaches explain why languages have the properties they have. Functional explanation entails the idea that language is a tool for communication, or that communication is the primary function of language. Linguistic forms are consequently explained by an appeal to their functional value, or usefulness. Other structuralist approaches take the perspective that form follows from the inner mechanisms of the bilateral and multilayered language system.

Biological 

Approaches such as cognitive linguistics and generative grammar study linguistic cognition with a view towards uncovering the biological underpinnings of language. In Generative Grammar, these underpinning are understood as including innate domain-specific grammatical knowledge. Thus, one of the central concerns of the approach is to discover what aspects of linguistic knowledge are innate and which are not.

Cognitive Linguistics, in contrast, rejects the notion of innate grammar, and studies how the human mind creates linguistic constructions from event schemas, and the impact of cognitive constraints and biases on human language. In cognitive linguistics, language is approached via the senses.

A closely related approach is evolutionary linguistics which includes the study of linguistic units as cultural replicators. It is possible to study how language replicates and adapts to the mind of the individual or the speech community. Construction grammar is a framework which applies the meme concept to the study of syntax.

The generative versus evolutionary approach are sometimes called formalism and functionalism, respectively. This reference is however different from the use of the terms in human sciences.

Methodology 
Linguistics is primarily descriptive. Linguists describe and explain features of language without making subjective judgments on whether a particular feature or usage is "good" or "bad". This is analogous to practice in other sciences: a zoologist studies the animal kingdom without making subjective judgments on whether a particular species is "better" or "worse" than another.

Prescription, on the other hand, is an attempt to promote particular linguistic usages over others, often favouring a particular dialect or "acrolect". This may have the aim of establishing a linguistic standard, which can aid communication over large geographical areas. It may also, however, be an attempt by speakers of one language or dialect to exert influence over speakers of other languages or dialects (see Linguistic imperialism). An extreme version of prescriptivism can be found among censors, who attempt to eradicate words and structures that they consider to be destructive to society. Prescription, however, may be practised appropriately in language instruction, like in ELT, where certain fundamental grammatical rules and lexical items need to be introduced to a second-language speaker who is attempting to acquire the language.

Sources 
Most contemporary linguists work under the assumption that spoken data and signed data are more fundamental than written data. This is because
 Speech appears to be universal to all human beings capable of producing and perceiving it, while there have been many cultures and speech communities that lack written communication;
 Features appear in speech which aren't always recorded in writing, including phonological rules, sound changes, and speech errors;
 All natural writing systems reflect a spoken language (or potentially a signed one), even with pictographic scripts like Dongba writing Naxi homophones with the same pictogram, and text in writing systems used for two languages changing to fit the spoken language being recorded;
 Speech evolved before human beings invented writing;
 Individuals learn to speak and process spoken language more easily and earlier than they do with writing.

Nonetheless, linguists agree that the study of written language can be worthwhile and valuable. For research that relies on corpus linguistics and computational linguistics, written language is often much more convenient for processing large amounts of linguistic data. Large corpora of spoken language are difficult to create and hard to find, and are typically transcribed and written. In addition, linguists have turned to text-based discourse occurring in various formats of computer-mediated communication as a viable site for linguistic inquiry.

The study of writing systems themselves, graphemics, is, in any case, considered a branch of linguistics.

Analysis 
Before the 20th century, linguists analysed language on a diachronic plane, which was historical in focus. This meant that they would compare linguistic features and try to analyse language from the point of view of how it had changed between then and later. However, with the rise of Saussurean linguistics in the 20th century, the focus shifted to a more synchronic approach, where the study was geared towards analysis and comparison between different language variations, which existed at the same given point of time.

At another level, the syntagmatic plane of linguistic analysis entails the comparison between the way words are sequenced, within the syntax of a sentence. For example, the article "the" is followed by a noun, because of the syntagmatic relation between the words. The paradigmatic plane on the other hand, focuses on an analysis that is based on the paradigms or concepts that are embedded in a given text. In this case, words of the same type or class may be replaced in the text with each other to achieve the same conceptual understanding.

History 

The earliest activities in the description of language have been attributed to the 6th-century-BC Indian grammarian Pāṇini who wrote a formal description of the Sanskrit language in his . Today, modern-day theories on grammar employ many of the principles that were laid down then.

Nomenclature 
Before the 20th century, the term philology, first attested in 1716, was commonly used to refer to the study of language, which was then predominantly historical in focus. Since Ferdinand de Saussure's insistence on the importance of synchronic analysis, however, this focus has shifted and the term philology is now generally used for the "study of a language's grammar, history, and literary tradition", especially in the United States (where philology has never been very popularly considered as the "science of language").

Although the term linguist in the sense of "a student of language" dates from 1641, the term linguistics is first attested in 1847. It is now the usual term in English for the scientific study of language, though linguistic science is sometimes used.

Linguistics is a multi-disciplinary field of research that combines tools from natural sciences, social sciences, formal sciences, and the humanities. Many linguists, such as David Crystal, conceptualize the field as being primarily scientific. The term linguist applies to someone who studies language or is a researcher within the field, or to someone who uses the tools of the discipline to describe and analyse specific languages.

Early grammarians 

The formal study of language began in India with Pāṇini, the 6th century BC grammarian who formulated 3,959 rules of Sanskrit morphology. Pāṇini's systematic classification of the sounds of Sanskrit into consonants and vowels, and word classes, such as nouns and verbs, was the first known instance of its kind. In the Middle East, Sibawayh, a Persian, made a detailed description of Arabic in AD 760 in his monumental work, Al-kitab fii an-naħw (The Book on Grammar), the first known author to distinguish between sounds and phonemes (sounds as units of a linguistic system). Western interest in the study of languages began somewhat later than in the East, but the grammarians of the classical languages did not use the same methods or reach the same conclusions as their contemporaries in the Indic world. Early interest in language in the West was a part of philosophy, not of grammatical description. The first insights into semantic theory were made by Plato in his Cratylus dialogue, where he argues that words denote concepts that are eternal and exist in the world of ideas. This work is the first to use the word etymology to describe the history of a word's meaning. Around 280 BC, one of Alexander the Great's successors founded a university (see Musaeum) in Alexandria, where a school of philologists studied the ancient texts in and taught Greek to speakers of other languages. While this school was the first to use the word "grammar" in its modern sense, Plato had used the word in its original meaning as "téchnē grammatikḗ", the "art of writing", which is also the title of one of the most important works of the Alexandrine school by Dionysius Thrax. Throughout the Middle Ages, the study of language was subsumed under the topic of philology, the study of ancient languages and texts, practised by such educators as Roger Ascham, Wolfgang Ratke, and John Amos Comenius.

Comparative philology
In the 18th century, the first use of the comparative method by William Jones sparked the rise of comparative linguistics. Bloomfield attributes "the first great scientific linguistic work of the world" to Jacob Grimm, who wrote Deutsche Grammatik. It was soon followed by other authors writing similar comparative studies on other language groups of Europe. The study of language was broadened from Indo-European to language in general by Wilhelm von Humboldt, of whom Bloomfield asserts:

20th-century developments 
There was a shift of focus from historical and comparative linguistics to synchronic analysis in early 20th century. Structural analysis was improved by Leonard Bloomfield, Louis Hjelmslev; and Zellig Harris who also developed methods of discourse analysis. Functional analysis was developed by the Prague linguistic circle and André Martinet. As sound recording devices became commonplace in the 1960s, dialectal recordings were made and archived, and the audio-lingual method provided a technological solution to foreign language learning. The 1960s also saw a new rise of comparative linguistics: the study of language universals in linguistic typology. Towards the end of the century the field of linguistics became divided into further areas of interest with the advent of language technology and digitalised corpora.

Areas of research

Sociolinguistics 

Sociolinguistics is the study of how language is shaped by social factors. This sub-discipline focuses on the synchronic approach of linguistics, and looks at how a language in general, or a set of languages, display variation and varieties at a given point in time. The study of language variation and the different varieties of language through dialects, registers, and idiolects can be tackled through a study of style, as well as through analysis of discourse. Sociolinguists research both style and discourse in language, as well as the theoretical factors that are at play between language and society.

Developmental linguistics 

Developmental linguistics is the study of the development of linguistic ability in individuals, particularly the acquisition of language in childhood. Some of the questions that developmental linguistics looks into are how children acquire different languages, how adults can acquire a second language, and what the process of language acquisition is.

Neurolinguistics 

Neurolinguistics is the study of the structures in the human brain that underlie grammar and communication. Researchers are drawn to the field from a variety of backgrounds, bringing along a variety of experimental techniques as well as widely varying theoretical perspectives. Much work in neurolinguistics is informed by models in psycholinguistics and theoretical linguistics, and is focused on investigating how the brain can implement the processes that theoretical and psycholinguistics propose are necessary in producing and comprehending language. Neurolinguists study the physiological mechanisms by which the brain processes information related to language, and evaluate linguistic and psycholinguistic theories, using aphasiology, brain imaging, electrophysiology, and computer modelling. Amongst the structures of the brain involved in the mechanisms of neurolinguistics, the cerebellum which contains the highest numbers of neurons has a major role in terms of predictions required to produce language.

Applied linguistics 

Linguists are largely concerned with finding and describing the generalities and varieties both within particular languages and among all languages. Applied linguistics takes the results of those findings and "applies" them to other areas. Linguistic research is commonly applied to areas such as language education, lexicography, translation, language planning, which involves governmental policy implementation related to language use, and natural language processing. "Applied linguistics" has been argued to be something of a misnomer. Applied linguists actually focus on making sense of and engineering solutions for real-world linguistic problems, and not literally "applying" existing technical knowledge from linguistics. Moreover, they commonly apply technical knowledge from multiple sources, such as sociology (e.g., conversation analysis) and anthropology. (Constructed language fits under Applied linguistics.)

Today, computers are widely used in many areas of applied linguistics. Speech synthesis and speech recognition use phonetic and phonemic knowledge to provide voice interfaces to computers. Applications of computational linguistics in machine translation, computer-assisted translation, and natural language processing are areas of applied linguistics that have come to the forefront. Their influence has had an effect on theories of syntax and semantics, as modelling syntactic and semantic theories on computers constraints.

Linguistic analysis is a sub-discipline of applied linguistics used by many governments to verify the claimed nationality of people seeking asylum who do not hold the necessary documentation to prove their claim. This often takes the form of an interview by personnel in an immigration department. Depending on the country, this interview is conducted either in the asylum seeker's native language through an interpreter or in an international lingua franca like English. Australia uses the former method, while Germany employs the latter; the Netherlands uses either method depending on the languages involved. Tape recordings of the interview then undergo language analysis, which can be done either by private contractors or within a department of the government. In this analysis, linguistic features of the asylum seeker are used by analysts to make a determination about the speaker's nationality. The reported findings of the linguistic analysis can play a critical role in the government's decision on the refugee status of the asylum seeker.

Language documentation 
Language documentation combines anthropological inquiry (into the history and culture of language) with linguistic inquiry, in order to describe languages and their grammars. Lexicography involves the documentation of words that form a vocabulary. Such a documentation of a linguistic vocabulary from a particular language is usually compiled in a dictionary. Computational linguistics is concerned with the statistical or rule-based modeling of natural language from a computational perspective. Specific knowledge of language is applied by speakers during the act of translation and interpretation, as well as in language education – the teaching of a second or foreign language. Policy makers work with governments to implement new plans in education and teaching which are based on linguistic research.

Since the inception of the discipline of linguistics, linguists have been concerned with describing and analysing previously undocumented languages. Starting with Franz Boas in the early 1900s, this became the main focus of American linguistics until the rise of formal linguistics in the mid-20th century. This focus on language documentation was partly motivated by a concern to document the rapidly disappearing languages of indigenous peoples. The ethnographic dimension of the Boasian approach to language description played a role in the development of disciplines such as sociolinguistics, anthropological linguistics, and linguistic anthropology, which investigate the relations between language, culture, and society.

The emphasis on linguistic description and documentation has also gained prominence outside North America, with the documentation of rapidly dying indigenous languages becoming a focus in some university programmes in linguistics. Language description is a work-intensive endeavour, usually requiring years of field work in the language concerned, so as to equip the linguist to write a sufficiently accurate reference grammar. Further, the task of documentation requires the linguist to collect a substantial corpus in the language in question, consisting of texts and recordings, both sound and video, which can be stored in an accessible format within open repositories, and used for further research.

Translation 

The sub-field of translation includes the translation of written and spoken texts across media, from digital to print and spoken. To translate literally means to transmute the meaning from one language into another. Translators are often employed by organizations such as travel agencies and governmental embassies to facilitate communication between two speakers who do not know each other's language. Translators are also employed to work within computational linguistics setups like Google Translate, which is an automated program to translate words and phrases between any two or more given languages. Translation is also conducted by publishing houses, which convert works of writing from one language to another in order to reach varied audiences. Academic translators specialize in or are familiar with various other disciplines such as technology, science, law, economics, etc.

Clinical linguistics 

Clinical linguistics is the application of linguistic theory to the field of speech-language pathology. Speech language pathologists work on corrective measures to treat communication and swallowing disorders.

Chaika (1990) showed that people with schizophrenia who display speech disorders like rhyming inappropriately have attentional dysfunction, as when a patient was shown a color chip and then asked to identify it, responded "looks like clay. Sounds like gray. Take you for a roll in the hay. Heyday, May Day." The color chip was actually clay-colored, so his first response was correct.'

However, most people suppress or ignore words which rhyme with what they've said unless they are deliberately producing a pun, poem or rap. Even then, the speaker shows connection between words chosen for rhyme and an overall meaning in discourse. People with schizophrenia with speech dysfunction show no such relation between rhyme and reason. Some even produce stretches of gibberish combined with recognizable words.

Computational linguistics 

Computational linguistics is the study of linguistic issues in a way that is "computationally responsible", i.e., taking careful note of computational consideration of algorithmic specification and computational complexity, so that the linguistic theories devised can be shown to exhibit certain desirable computational properties and their implementations. Computational linguists also work on computer language and software development.

Evolutionary linguistics 

Evolutionary linguistics is the study of the emergence of the language faculty through human evolution, and also the application of evolutionary theory to the study of cultural evolution among different languages. It is also a study of the dispersal of various languages across the globe, through movements among ancient communities. Evolutionary linguistics is a highly interdisciplinary field, including linguists, biologists, neuroscientists, psychologists, mathematicians, and others. By shifting the focus of investigation in linguistics to a comprehensive scheme that embraces the natural sciences, it seeks to yield a framework by which the fundamentals of language are understood.

Forensic linguistics 

Forensic linguistics is the application of linguistic analysis to forensics. Forensic analysis investigates the style, language, lexical use, and other linguistic and grammatical features used in the legal context to provide evidence in courts of law. Forensic linguists have also used their expertise in the framework of criminal cases.

See also 

 Articulatory synthesis
 Axiom of categoricity
 Critical discourse analysis
 Cryptanalysis
 Decipherment
 Global language system
 Hermeneutics
 Integrational linguistics
 Integrationism
 Interlinguistics
 Language engineering
 Language geography
 Metalinguistics
 Metacommunicative competence
 Microlinguistics
 Onomastics
 Reading
 Speech processing
 Stratificational linguistics
 Outline and lists
 Index of linguistics articles
 List of departments of linguistics
 List of summer schools of linguistics
 List of schools of linguistics
 List of unsolved problems in linguistics

Citations

General and cited references

External links 

 The Linguist List, a global online linguistics community with news and information updated daily
 Glossary of linguistic terms  by SIL International (last updated 2004)
 Glottopedia, MediaWiki-based encyclopedia of linguistics, under construction
 Linguistic sub-fields – according to the Linguistic Society of America
 Linguistics and language-related wiki articles on Scholarpedia and Citizendium
 "Linguistics" section – A Bibliography of Literary Theory, Criticism and Philology, ed. J.A. García Landa (University of Zaragoza, Spain)
 
 

 
Cognitive science
Communication studies
Indian inventions
Language